Patrick Colleter (born 6 November 1965) is a French former professional footballer who played as a full-back.

Career

Early career
Colleter begin his football career with his local team Brest in 1986. After some impressive performances, Colleter was rewarded with a call-up to the French B national team, and a transfer to Montpellier in 1990. After one season at the southern club he spent five seasons at Paris Saint-Germain, where he won the Ligue 1 in 1994, the Coupe de France in 1993 and 1995 and the Coupe de la Ligue in 1995 as well as the UEFA Cup Winners' Cup in 1996. In 1996, he left Paris to enjoy single-season spells at Bordeaux and Olympique de Marseille.

Southampton
In December 1998, he was signed by Southampton for £300,000. He made his debut at left-back on 26 December 1998 at home to Chelsea taking the place of the Saints' long-established left-back Francis Benali. He scored one goal for the club, a long-range strike in a 3-1 victory at home to Charlton Athletic on 9 January 1999.

He was a fiery but capable full-back, but his career at Southampton suffered following Dave Jones' replacement as manager by Glenn Hoddle. Hoddle was not keen on the Gallic method of defending and Colleter was left to grow frustrated in the reserves. Colleter eventually left Southampton in November 2000 he moved back to French football with Cannes. In all he played 26 games for Southampton, scoring once.

Return to France
After two seasons at Cannes, Colleter left in December 2002 to play for Saint-Médard-en-Jalles before becoming a coach at Bordeaux.

Career statistics

Notes

Honours
Paris Saint-Germain
Ligue 1: 1994
Coupe de France: 1993 and 1995
Coupe de la Ligue: 1995
Trophée des Champions: 1995
UEFA Cup Winners' Cup: 1996

References

External links
 

1965 births
Living people
Sportspeople from Brest, France
French footballers
Association football fullbacks
Footballers from Brittany
Brittany international footballers
Premier League players
Stade Brestois 29 players
Montpellier HSC players
Paris Saint-Germain F.C. players
FC Girondins de Bordeaux players
Olympique de Marseille players
Southampton F.C. players
AS Cannes players
Ligue 1 players
French expatriate footballers
French expatriate sportspeople in England
Expatriate footballers in England